Giovanni Pisano (c. 1250 – c. 1315) was an Italian sculptor, painter and architect, who worked in the cities of Pisa, Siena and Pistoia.  He is best known for his sculpture which shows the influence of both the French Gothic and the Ancient Roman art.  Henry Moore, referring to his statues for the facade of Siena Cathedral, called him "the first modern sculptor".

History 
Born in Pisa, Giovanni Pisano was the son of the famous sculptor Nicola Pisano. He received his training in the workshop of his father and in 1265–1268 he worked with his father on the pulpit in Siena Cathedral.  His next major work with his father was the fountain Fontana Maggiore in Perugia (completed 1278).  Nicola Pisano is thought to have died either around 1278 or in 1284 when Giovanni took up residence in Siena. These first works were made in Nicola's style and it is difficult to separate the contributions of the two artists. However the Madonna with Child can be attributed with certainty to Giovanni, showing a new style with a certain familiarity between Mother and Child.
 
Giovanni's next work was at Pisa Cathedral, sculpting the statues in the two rows of traceried gables at the exterior of the Baptistry (1277–1284). The vivacity of these statues is a new confirmation that he had left the serene style of his father behind. Between 1287 and 1296 he was appointed chief architect of Siena Cathedral. The architectural design and elegant sculptures for the facade of the cathedral in Siena show his tendency to blend Gothic art with reminders of Roman art. The work was continued after his death, with still greater Gothic elaboration, by Memmo di Filippuccio.

In 1296 he returned to Pisa to begin work on the Church of San Giovanni. In 1301 he continued his work on the Pulpit of Sant' Andrea, Pistoia which he had already started in 1297. The pulpit has five reliefs: the Annunciation and Nativity; the Adoration, the Dream of the Magi and the Angel warning Joseph; the Massacre of the Innocents; the Crucifixion; and the Last Judgement.

Giovanni's work between 1302 and 1310 at the new pulpit for the Cathedral of Pisa shows his distinct preference for animation in his characters and moved his father's style even further away. This pulpit with its dramatic scenes has become his masterwork.  It shows nine scenes from the New Testament, carved in white marble with a chiaroscuro effect. It contains even a bold, naturalistic depiction of a naked Hercules. His figure Prudence in the pulpit may have been an inspiration for the Eve in the painting The Expulsion from the Garden of Eden by Masaccio.  After the fire of 1595, it was packed away during the redecoration and was not rediscovered and re-erected until 1926.

The church of San Nicola in Pisa was enlarged between 1297 and 1313 by the Augustinians, perhaps by the design of Giovanni Pisano. He was also responsible of the façade of San Paolo a Ripa d'Arno.  His last major work dates probably from 1313 when he made a monument in memory of Margaret of Brabant (who died in 1311) at the request of her husband emperor Henry VII.

Legacy
One of his pupils was Giovanni di Balduccio, who also became a famous sculptor, and the architect and sculptor Agostino da Siena. He also had an influence on the painter Pietro Lorenzetti. Giorgio Vasari included a biography of Pisano in his book Le vite dei più eccellenti pittori, scultori, e architetti

The asteroid 7313 Pisano was named to honour Nicola and Giovanni Pisano.

Gallery

See also 
Giovanni di Cecco 
Duccio 
Arnolfo di Cambio

References 

 Clario Di Fabio, Gianluca Ameri, Francesca Girelli, Giovanni Pisano, Art e Dossier, 376, Firenze-Milano, Giunti Editore 2020

 
 

1250 births
1315 deaths
13th-century Italian architects
14th-century Italian architects
13th-century Italian sculptors
Italian male sculptors
14th-century Italian sculptors
Sculptors from Tuscany
Gothic sculptors
People from Pisa